The Archangel Raphael and Tobias is an oil painting on panel of  by Antonio and Piero del Pollaiuolo, in the Galleria Sabauda in Turin.

The painting was mentioned by Giorgio Vasari as hanging on a pillar in the church of Orsanmichele in Florence, though he erroneously described it as being painted on canvas. Rediscovered in the Palazzo Tolomei on via Ginori in Florence by Gaetano Milanesi, it was acquired by Baron Hector de Garriod in 1865 for its present owner.

References

External links
 
 Online catalogue entry, Musei Reali Torino 

1460s paintings
Paintings by Antonio del Pollaiuolo
Paintings by Piero del Pollaiuolo
Paintings in the Galleria Sabauda
Paintings of Raphael (archangel)
Paintings depicting Tobias